Segundo Gastón was the mayor of Cagayan de Misamis from 1916 to 1919, Governor of Misamis from 1923 to 1925, and  Representative of Misamis's 1st district from 1925 to 1928. The Gaston Park in Cagayan de Oro is named after him. The National Assembly of the Philippines made a resolution about his passing for his work as a representative in the seventh and tenth Philippine legislature.

References

Mayors of Cagayan de Oro
Governors of Misamis Oriental
Members of the Philippine Legislature
Members of the House of Representatives of the Philippines from Misamis Oriental